Rupakot may refer to:

Rupakot, Kaski in the Gandaki Zone of Nepal
Rupakot, Tanahu in the Gandaki Zone of Nepal
Rupakot, Lumbini, Nepal